{{DISPLAYTITLE:δ15N}}
In  geochemistry, hydrology, paleoclimatology and paleoceanography, δ15N  (pronounced "delta fifteen n") or delta-N-15 is a measure of the ratio of the two stable isotopes of nitrogen, 15N:14N.

Formulas

Both have the form  ‰ (‰ = permil or parts per thousand) where s and a are the relative abundances of 15N in respectively the sample and the atmosphere. The difference is whether the relative abundance is with respect to all the nitrogen, i.e. 14N plus 15N, or just to 14N. Since the atmosphere is 99.6337% 14N and 0.3663% 15N, a is 0.003663 in the former case and 0.003663/0.996337 = 0.003676 in the latter. However s varies similarly; for example if in the sample 15N is 0.385% and 14N is 99.615%, s is 0.003850 in the former case and 0.00385/0.99615 = 0.003865 in the latter.

Applications

One use of 15N is as a tracer to determine the path taken by fertilizers applied to anything from pots to landscapes.

Another application is the assessment of human waste water discharge into bodies of water.  The abundance of 15N  is greater in human waste water than in natural water sources.  Hence  in benthic sediment gives an indication of the contribution of human waste to the total nitrogen in the sediment.  Sediment cores analyzed for  yield an historical record of such waste, with older samples at greater depths.

 is also used to measure food chain length and the trophic level of a given organism; high  values are positively correlated with higher trophic levels; likewise, organisms low on the food chain generally exhibit lower  values. Higher  values in apex predators generally indicate longer food chains.

References

See also 
 
 
 
 Isotopic signature
 Isotope analysis
 Isotope geochemistry

Bioindicators
Nitrogen
Isotopes of nitrogen
Environmental isotopes
Geochemistry